Igor Valetov (born 1 February 1946 in Tashkent, Uzbek SSR) is a Soviet fencer. He won a bronze medal in the team épée event at the 1972 Summer Olympics.

References

1946 births
Living people
Kazakhstani male épée fencers
Belarusian male épée fencers
Soviet male épée fencers
Olympic fencers of the Soviet Union
Fencers at the 1972 Summer Olympics
Olympic bronze medalists for the Soviet Union
Olympic medalists in fencing
Medalists at the 1972 Summer Olympics
Sportspeople from Tashkent